Horton Ledge is a flat rock ledge that caps the southwestern extremity of Pecora Escarpment, at the southwest end of the Pensacola Mountains in Antarctica. It was mapped by the United States Geological Survey from surveys and U.S. Navy air photos, 1956–66, and was named by the Advisory Committee on Antarctic Names for Edward C. Horton, Jr., an electronics technician at Plateau Station in the winter of 1966.

References

Ridges of Queen Elizabeth Land